Carlos Gómez (born January 1, 1962) is an American actor.

Life and career
Gómez was born in New York, to Cuban American parents, the son of Cora Gomez. He is an actor who has starred in both film and on the small screen since the late 1980s. His first part in a film came in the form of a dancer looking to make it big in Dance to Win (1989). One of his more notable performances is considered to be as gay paramedic Raul Melendez in ER (1995–1996).

He has, among other roles, guest-starred as a repeating support villain on the hit television show Charmed as the San Francisco Police Department (SFPD) Internal Affairs Department Inspector (and undercover demon) Rodriguez pressuring the regular character Andy Trudeau. He first appeared in the 20th episode of the first season "The Power of Two", and his final appearance was in the 22nd episode of the season (its finale) "Deja Vu All Over Again".

He has also starred alongside Salma Hayek in two films, the first being Desperado, where he plays the Right Hand of Bucho, the man Antonio Banderas spends the film looking for, and also, in Fools Rush In, where he plays Salma's ex-boyfriend, Chuy. Carlos can also be seen in the CBS drama Shark, where he plays Mayor Manny Delgado, alongside James Woods and Jeri Ryan.

Gomez appeared in the 2008 Broadway musical In the Heights as Kevin, and was a cast member of the A&E television series The Glades for all four seasons. He also played the part of officer Navarro in the Criminal Minds episode "Machismo".

He also appeared in season 3 of the NBC sitcom Friends episode titled "The One with All the Jealousy", and in season 3 of the Fox drama 24. He appeared in Dolphin Tale 2.  In 2020, Gomez was cast as Rafael Garcia, the lead character's father, in the ABC romantic comedy-drama series The Baker and the Beauty.

Filmography

References

External links 

Official Site for actor Carlos Gomez

1962 births
American male film actors
American male television actors
Living people
Hispanic and Latino American male actors
Male actors from New York City